Georg Solmssen (born Georg Adolf Salomonsohn, 7 August 1869 – 10 January 1957) was a German banker.

Life 
His father was German banker Adolph Salomonsohn and his mother was Sara Rinkel. His uncle was German banker Arthur Salomonsohn, and his nephew was American writer Arthur R.G. Solmssen.
He studied German law. In April 1900, he converted from Judaism to Christianity and changed his family name from Salomonsohn to Solmssen. Solmssen worked from 1900 for German bank Disconto-Gesellschaft in Berlin. He was a member of the supervisory board of German company Lufthansa AG and German company Vereinigte Stahlwerke. In 1933, Solmssen was for a short time the speaker of the management board for German bank Deutsche Bank, which took over Disconto-Gesellschaft in 1929. He lived in the 1920s on the island of Schwanenwerder. When the Nazis came to power, Solmssen left Germany and emigrated to Switzerland.

Literature 
 Berlin-Brandenburgischen Akademie der Wissenschaften (ed.): Acta Borussica. Neue Folge, Reihe 1: Die Protokolle des Preußischen Staatsministeriums 1817–1934/38. Band 12, 2: Reinhold Zilch, Bärbel Holtz: April 4, 1925 until May 10, 1938. Olms-Weidmann, Hildesheim u. a. 2004, p. 702.
 Gerald D. Feldman: Jewish bankers and the crises of the Weimar Republic (= Leo Baeck Memorial Lecture. 39, ZDB-ID 415081-8). Leo Baeck Institute, New York NY 1995.
 Harold James, Martin L. Müller (Hrsg.): Georg Solmssen – ein deutscher Bankier. Briefe aus einem halben Jahrhundert 1900–1956 (= Schriftenreihe zur Zeitschrift für Unternehmensgeschichte. 25). Herausgegeben im Auftrag der Historischen Gesellschaft der Deutschen Bank e.V. C. H. Beck, Munich 2012, .
 Martin L. Müller: Solmssen, Georg Adolf. In: Neue Deutsche Biographie (NDB). Band 24, Duncker & Humblot, Berlin 2010, pp 557 f.

External links 

 
 Biography by Historische Gesellschaft der Deutschen Bank

References 

German bankers
Businesspeople from Berlin
German jurists
Converts to Lutheranism from Judaism
German Lutherans
People from Steglitz-Zehlendorf
1869 births
1957 deaths
Deutsche Bank people
Jewish emigrants from Nazi Germany to Switzerland